This is a list of engineering colleges operated by the Government of Tamil Nadu.

References

 

Government Engineering Colleges
Government Engineering Colleges
Tamil Nadu
Government of Tamil Nadu